Cody Eakin (born May 24, 1991) is a Canadian professional ice hockey forward who is currently playing with the SCL Tigers of the National League (NL). He was selected by the Washington Capitals in the third round, 85th overall, of the 2009 NHL Entry Draft and has previously played for the Capitals, Dallas Stars, Vegas Golden Knights, Winnipeg Jets and Buffalo Sabres.

Playing career

Major junior
Eakin was drafted in the first round, sixth overall, by the Swift Current Broncos in the 2006 WHL Draft. At the 2009 NHL Entry Draft, he was selected by the Washington Capitals in the third round, 85th overall.

In 2010, Eakin was named to the WHL (East) Second All-Star Team. On January 9, 2011, he was traded to the Kootenay Ice in exchange for Christian Magnus, Ryan Bloom, Jarett Zentner, Colby Cave, Steven Myland and three draft picks ranging from 2011 to 2012. In his first year with the Ice, Eakin was named to the WHL (East) Second All-Star Team.

Professional

Eakin began the 2011–12 season with the Washington Capitals' American Hockey League (AHL) affiliate, the Hershey Bears. On November 1, 2011, the Capitals called-up Eakin to their roster, and the following day, he made his NHL debut with in 13 minutes 19 seconds of ice time, but no points, in 5–4 overtime win over the visiting Anaheim Ducks. Eakin scored his first NHL goal on November 4 against Cam Ward of the Carolina Hurricanes.

On June 22, 2012, during the 2012 NHL Entry Draft, Eakin was traded to the Dallas Stars (along with a second-round draft pick) in exchange for Mike Ribeiro.

Eakin scored his first career Stanley Cup playoff goal on April 23, 2014, against Frederik Andersen of the Anaheim Ducks. The goal ended up being the game-winner in a 4–2 victory as the Stars tied the series at two games apiece.

On December 16, 2016, Eakin was suspended for four games for charging New York Rangers' goaltender Henrik Lundqvist.
 Through injury and a lack of production, Eakin endured his worst season in the NHL during the 2016–17 campaign, scoring just 3 goals and 9 assists (12 points) in 60 games.

On June 21, 2017, Eakin was left exposed by the Stars and chosen by the Vegas Golden Knights in the 2017 NHL Expansion Draft. In his first season with Vegas, Eakin scored 11 goals and 27 points in 80 games. The team fell in five games to Eakin's former club, the Capitals, in the 2018 Stanley Cup Finals. During the 2018 playoffs, Eakin scored 3 goals in 20 games.

The Golden Knights matched up with the San Jose Sharks during the first round of the 2019 playoffs. In Game 7 on April 23, Eakin cross-checked Joe Pavelski in the chest following a faceoff. Pavelski landed awkwardly on his head, causing the referees to issue Eakin a five-minute major penalty and a game misconduct, despite neither of them seeing the infraction. At the time of the penalty, the Golden Knights were leading 3–0 with just over ten minutes remaining. However, the Sharks would score four unanswered goals on the ensuing five-minute power play. When a major penalty is called, the entire penalty must be served, regardless of how many goals are scored. The Sharks eventually won the game 5–4 in overtime, eliminating the Golden Knights. According to Golden Knights general manager George McPhee, the league called him days after their elimination to apologize for the call, and referees Eric Furlatt and Dan O'Halloran did not officiate another game in the remainder of the 2019 playoffs.

In the following 2019–20 season, Eakin struggled to produce offensively with the Golden Knights positing just 10 points through 41 games. On February 21, 2020, Eakin was traded by the Golden Knights to his hometown Winnipeg Jets in exchange for a 2021 conditional fourth-round pick. Later, on March 9, 2020, Eakin scored his first goal as a Winnipeg Jet - the game-winning goal - in a 4–2 win vs the Arizona Coyotes.

On October 10, 2020, having left the Jets as a free agent, Eakin was signed to a two-year, $4.5 million contract with the Buffalo Sabres.

On September 11, 2022, Eakin signed a professional tryout agreement with the Calgary Flames. On October 6, he, alongside Sonny Milano, were released from their tryouts.

Personal life
Eakin grew up in an athletic family, as both his father and his uncle Bruce Eakin played professional hockey.

International play

Eakin was a member of Canada's gold medal-winning team at the 2015 World Championships, where Canada won the title for the first time since 2007 with a perfect 10–0 record.

Career statistics

Regular season and playoffs

International

Awards and honours

References

External links
 

1991 births
Living people
Buffalo Sabres players
Canadian ice hockey centres
Dallas Stars players
Hershey Bears players
Kootenay Ice players
SCL Tigers players
Ice hockey people from Winnipeg
Swift Current Broncos players
Texas Stars players
Vegas Golden Knights players
Washington Capitals draft picks
Washington Capitals players
Winnipeg Jets players